Aleksandr Khvostunov (born 9 January 1974) is an Uzbekistani football defender currently playing for NBU Osiyo.

Playing career

Club
He played for Bunyodkor in 2007–2010. In July 2011 he joined FK Samarqand-Dinamo before playing in Qizilqum Zarafshon. In 2013, he joined NBU Osiyo, club playing in Uzbekistan First League.

National team
He earned 49 caps scoring 3 goals for the national team between 1997 and 2004.

Career statistics

International goals

Honours
Pakhtakor
Uzbek League (1): 1998

Bunyodkor
Uzbek League (3): 2008, 2009, 2010
Uzbek Cup (1): 2010

References

External links

1974 births
Living people
People from Qashqadaryo Region
Soviet footballers
Uzbekistani footballers
Uzbekistan international footballers
Uzbekistani expatriate footballers
FC Nasaf players
Pakhtakor Tashkent FK players
FC Lada-Tolyatti players
Expatriate footballers in Kazakhstan
FC Chornomorets Odesa players
FC Bunyodkor players
FC Zhetysu players
Navbahor Namangan players
Uzbekistani expatriate sportspeople in Kazakhstan
Expatriate footballers in Ukraine
Uzbekistani expatriate sportspeople in Ukraine
2000 AFC Asian Cup players
FK Dinamo Samarqand players
Footballers at the 1998 Asian Games
Uzbekistani people of Russian descent
Association football defenders
PFC Krylia Sovetov Samara players
Asian Games competitors for Uzbekistan